Perry Township is one of the fifteen townships of Putnam County, Ohio, United States.  The 2000 census found 1,206 people in the township, 737 of whom lived in the unincorporated portions of the township.

Geography
Located in the western part of the county, it borders the following townships:
Monroe Township - north
Palmer Township - northeast corner
Greensburg Township - east
Union Township - southeast corner
Jackson Township - south
Washington Township, Paulding County - west
Brown Township, Paulding County - northwest

Two villages are located in Perry Township: Dupont in the northern part of the township, and Cloverdale in the southern part of the township.

Name and history
Perry Township was established in 1828. This township was named for Oliver Hazard Perry, a military leader of the War of 1812. It is one of twenty-six Perry Townships statewide.

Government
The township is governed by a three-member board of trustees, who are elected in November of odd-numbered years to a four-year term beginning on the following January 1. Two are elected in the year after the presidential election and one is elected in the year before it. There is also an elected township fiscal officer, who serves a four-year term beginning on April 1 of the year after the election, which is held in November of the year before the presidential election. Vacancies in the fiscal officership or on the board of trustees are filled by the remaining trustees.

References

External links
County website

Townships in Putnam County, Ohio
Townships in Ohio